Thomas Goyard  (born 15 January 1992) is a French competitive sailor.

He won bronze medals at the Windsurfing World Championships in 2014 and 2020. He qualified to represent France at the 2020 Summer Olympics in Tokyo 2021, competing in men's RS:X where he won the silver medal.

References

External links

 

1992 births
Living people
French male sailors (sport)
Sailors at the 2020 Summer Olympics – RS:X
Olympic sailors of France
Medalists at the 2020 Summer Olympics
Olympic silver medalists for France
Olympic medalists in sailing
21st-century French people
French windsurfers